Umhausen is a municipality in the Imst district of state of Tyrol in western Austria. It and is located 17 km southeast of Imst at the  Ötztaler Ache in the Ötztal.  It has 3078 inhabitants.

Geography
The municipality consists of six villages:
Umhausen
Tumpen
Köfels
Farst
Niederthai
Östen

Umhausen is located at the intersection of the Stubai Alps and the Ötztal Alps. Its name comes from its great, white, light-reflecting, quartz layers, which allegedly cause the mountain to "radiate" (strahlen). It has the shape of a well-proportioned, steep and pointed pyramid. Ascending the Strahlkogel is difficult and it is thus only rarely visited, unlike the neighbouring 3,287-metre-high  Breiter Grieskogel.

Climate

Economy
Umhausen was once a centre for cultivation of flax.

Today the main source of income is tourism. In the area of the community lies the tallest waterfall of Tyrol at 150 metres of height. The economy in Umhausen is a bit smaller than the economy in Längenfeld. It is supported by local craft enterprises. Moreover, the Vivea Gesundheitshotel Umhausen opened in 2011, which plays a large role in the local economy.

Landslide
The Köfels landslide was a gigantic landslide, known as a sturzstrom, that occurred in the Ötz valley 9800±100 years ago according to radiocarbon dating of trees buried by the event. It involved a 2.5 km horizontal displacement and 800 m vertical displacement of 3.2 km3 of rock and mud along the Ötz valley floor, making it the third largest known sturzstrom.

Population

Hedwig von Trapp / The Sound of Music

Hedwig von Trapp, a member of the singing von Trapp family, lived and worked as a music teacher in Farst, above Umhausen. She moved there in the 1960s to treat her asthma. The school building is still present.

References

External links

Information on Umhausen 

Austria
Cities and towns in Imst District